Alexander Viktorovich Kulakov (born 15 May 1983) is a Belarusian professional ice hockey forward. He is currently playing for Yunost Minsk of the Belarusian Extraleague (BXL). He previously joined Torpedo Nizhny Novgorod after a lengthy first tenure with HC Dinamo Minsk. He has also competed in the Eastern European Hockey League and the Belarusian Extraliga.

Kulakov was selected for the Belarus national team in the 2010 Winter Olympics. He also participated at the 2010 IIHF World Championship.  He previously represented Belarus at the 2000 and 2001 IIHF World U18 Championships, the 2001, 2002 and 2003 IIHF World U20 Championship, and the 2007, 2008 and 2009 Ice Hockey World Championships.

Career statistics

Regular season and playoffs

International

References

External links

1983 births
Living people
Belarusian ice hockey left wingers
HC Dinamo Minsk players
Expatriate ice hockey players in Russia
Keramin Minsk players
Torpedo Nizhny Novgorod players
Ice hockey players at the 2010 Winter Olympics
Olympic ice hockey players of Belarus
Ice hockey people from Minsk
Yunost Minsk players